Layakahro village is known as the one of the most educated and well developed villages of Tehsil Diplo. Layakharo is the richest village of Tharparkar as well.  Layakharo is 13 km north east of Diplo Town in the District of Tharparkar, Sindh, Pakistan. Layakharo is situated within the Thar Desert.

Geography
Layakharo is 13 km north east of Diplo Town in the District of Tharparkar, Sindh, Pakistan.  Layakharo is situated within the Thar Desert.

Demographics

Five Medical Doctors, four Engineers and 28 Government Teachers (7 Female and 21 Male)  live in Layakharo village. There are 54 employees in the public sector and 62 employees related with private sector. The residents of Layakharo work in the Pakistan Army, Police, PTCL, Banking, SUI Gas, UCG Thar Coal, Health Department, Veterinary Department as well as other public and private sector occupations. Many other residents engage in cattle keeping and dairy.

Education 
•	Government Boys High School.
•	Government Boys DEEP Elementary School. 
•	Government Boys Primary School.
•	Government Girls Middle School.
•	Government Primary School.
•	Madrsa

Infrastructure 
Layakharo has a Government medical dispensary and a government veterinary center

A metal road connects to Diplo.  A second metal road leads to Kaloi and Badin.

A water supply line from barrage area supplies safe drinking water.

Social and Educational Activities 

We have a Youth Group in village named by "Layakharo Youth Forum for Education" (LYFE) where we conduct different activities to promote education in our village and area because we are well known that Education is the only solution to fight with poverty and droughts in Tharparkar. 
LYFE has Facebook Id (lyfelayakharo).
We have Village Facebook page Layakharo(Diplo Tharparkar).

Mobile Network Issues 
Huge sand mounds surrounding Layakharo village block all cellular signals except on the top of the mounds. Diplo town 13km away, has the following networks available:
•	Warid
•	Mobilink
•	Zong
•	Ufone
•	Telenor2G

|{

See also
Sant Nenuram Ashram

References

Villages in Sindh
Populated places in Tharparkar District
Tharparkar District
Thar Desert